Buranovo may refer to:
Buranovo, Bulgaria, a place in Kocherinovo municipality of Kyustendil Province, Bulgaria
Buranovo, Russia, several rural localities in Russia